Rodney Howe (born 31 January 1973) is an Australian former rugby league footballer who played in the 1990s and 2000s. He played in the forwards for the Newcastle Knights, Western Reds, Melbourne Storm, New South Wales and for the Australian national side.

Early life
Born in Newcastle, New South Wales. Howe was educated at St Francis Xavier's College, Hamilton, where he represented 1990 Australian Schoolboys.

Career
In 1998 Howe was banned for 22 matches for using stanozolol.

Howe played at prop forward for Melbourne in their victory in the 1999 NRL Grand Final.

In 2000 Howe was named the Melbourne Storm's player of the year.
In 2001, Howe won a special sports edition of Australian game show The Weakest Link, defeating Kangaroos AFL player David King, winning $46,300 in total winnings and donating it towards the Cancer Council of Victoria. It was, at the time one of the highest ever scores achieved on the show.

Howe was again named the Storm's player of the year in 2002.

References

External links

1973 births
Living people
Australia national rugby league team players
Australian rugby league players
Australian sportspeople in doping cases
Doping cases in Australian rugby league
Doping cases in rugby league
Melbourne Storm players
New South Wales Rugby League State of Origin players
Newcastle Knights players
Rugby league props
Rugby league players from Newcastle, New South Wales
Western Reds players